The Shea Site is a Native American archeological site near Embden, North Dakota.  It was the site of a Native American village on a bluff overlooking the Maple River floodplain.  It was protected by a deep "dry moat or fortification ditch."  The  site was excavated by archaeologists in the mid-1980s and listed on the National Register of Historic Places in 1996.

References

Archaeological sites on the National Register of Historic Places in North Dakota
National Register of Historic Places in Cass County, North Dakota
Native American history of North Dakota